Beats Electronics LLC (also known as Beats by Dr. Dre, or simply Beats by Dre) is an American consumer audio products manufacturer headquartered in Culver City, California. The company was founded by music producer Dr. Dre and record company executive Jimmy Iovine. Since 2014, it has been an Apple subsidiary.

The subsidiary's product line is primarily focused on headphones and speakers. The company's original product line was manufactured in partnership with the AV equipment company Monster Cable Products. Following the end of its contract with the company, Beats took further development of its products in-house. In 2014, the company expanded into the online music market with the launch of a subscription-based streaming service, Beats Music.

In 2011, NPD Group reported that Beats' market share was 64% in the U.S. for headphones priced higher than $100, and the brand was valued at $1billion in September 2013.

For a period, the company was majority-owned by Taiwanese smartphone maker HTC. The company reduced its stake to 25% in 2012, and sold its remaining stake back to the company in 2013. Concurrently, Carlyle Group replaced HTC as a minority shareholder, alongside Dr. Dre and Iovine in late 2013. On August 1, 2014, Apple acquired Beats for $3 billion in a cash and stock deal, the largest acquisition in Apple's history.

History

Formation 

Beats was established in 2006 by music producer Dr. Dre and record company executive Jimmy Iovine. Iovine perceived two key problems in the music industry: the impact of piracy on music sales and the substandard audio quality provided by Apple's plastic earbuds. Iovine recalled that Dre said to him: "Man, it's one thing that people steal my music. It's another thing to destroy the feeling of what I've worked on." Iovine sought the opinions of musicians with "great taste", such as M.I.A., Pharrell Williams, will.i.am, and Gwen Stefani during the early developmental stage. Beats initially partnered with inventor Noel Lee and his company Monster Cable, an audio and video component manufacturer based in Brisbane, California, to manufacture and develop the first Beats-branded products, and debuted its first product, Beats by Dr. Dre Studio headphones, on July 25, 2008.

To promote its products, Beats primarily relied on celebrity endorsements by pop and hip-hop music performers, including product placement within music videos, and partnering with musicians and other celebrities to develop co-branded products. Beats' use of endorsements by musicians helped the company aggressively target the young adult demographics.

HTC purchase and non-renewal of Monster contract 
In August 2010, mobile phone manufacturer HTC acquired a 50.1% majority share in Beats for $309 million. The purchase was intended to allow HTC to compete with other cellphone makers by associating themselves with the Beats brand, as the purchase also granted HTC exclusive rights to manufacture smartphones with Beats-branded audio systems. Despite its majority acquisition, HTC allowed Beats to operate as an autonomous company. Luke Wood, President of Beats in May 2014, joined the company in January 2010, when the company was a "licensing business". Wood had previously worked under Iovine at Interscope Records.

On January 19, 2012, BusinessWeek reported that Beats and Monster would not renew their production contract and their partnership ceased at the end of 2012. Dre and Iovine subsequently decided to oversee the entire operation of the company, from manufacturing to R&D, and aimed to double its workforce to around 300 employees. Monster would ultimately begin marketing its own competing line of premium headphones aimed towards an older demographic. At the time, neither Dre, Iovine or Wood were experienced in the operation of a company at such a grand level, but Wood explained in 2014:I didn't have manufacturing experience, but I had experience of building something from scratch… Every time we put out an album, it was basically like building a new business--a unique cast of characters, unique challenges and opportunities, and trying to figure out a unique path to market.

In October 2012, Beats unveiled its first two self-developed products, "Beats Executive" headphones and "Beats Pill" wireless speakers—Iovine believed that the company would now have to "control [its] own destiny" in order to continue its growth. Iovine also commented on how other headphone makers had attempted to emulate Beats' celebrity endorsement business model (including Monster themselves, who unveiled Earth, Wind and Fire and Miles Davis-themed headphones at the 2012 Consumer Electronics Show), stating that "some of our competitors are cheap engineers who have never been to a recording studio. You can't just stick someone's name on a headphone that doesn't know anything about sound." Following the decision to transform Beats into an autonomous entity, the company's revenues reached the $1 billion mark, according to Iovine.

HTC sale and Beats Music 

In July 2012, HTC sold back half of its stake in Beats for $150 million, remaining the largest shareholder with 25.1 percent. The sale was intended to provide "flexibility for global expansion while maintaining HTC's major stake and commercial exclusivity in mobile". In August 2013, reports surfaced that Beats' founders planned to buy back HTC's remaining minority stake in the company, and pursue a new, unspecified partner for a future investment.

On September 27, 2013, HTC confirmed that it would sell its remaining 24.84% stake in Beats back to the company for $265 million. Concurrently, Beats announced that the Carlyle Group would make a $500 million minority investment in the company. The overall deal valued Beats Electronics at $1 billion and helped HTC turn a net profit of $10.3 million for the fourth quarter of 2013, following HTC's first quarterly loss in company history.

The appointment of a new chief operating officer (COO), a role previously filled by Wood, was announced in early November 2013. Matthew Costello, formerly of IKEA and HTC, was formally appointed to the role in May 2014.

On January 21, 2014, the company launched Beats Music, a subscription-based online music streaming service. Prior to the launch of the service, Beats stated that it intends to provide a different type of streaming experience to what was available on the market at the time. Additionally, the service would only be available to consumers in the U.S. at inception.

Subsidiary of Apple Inc. (2014–present) 
On May 8, 2014, the Financial Times reported that Apple was in negotiations with Beats to purchase the company for $3.2 billion—the largest purchase in Apple's history and well ahead of its $429 million purchase of NeXT in 1996. The impending deal was prematurely and indirectly revealed in a photo and YouTube video posted to Facebook by Tyrese Gibson on May 8, 2014; the video documented a celebration in which Gibson and Dr. Dre made boasting remarks about the acquisition, with Dre declaring himself the "first billionaire in hip hop", while Gibson declared that the "Forbes list" had changed. Both the photo and video were removed from Facebook the following morning, but both remain on Gibson's YouTube channel. Indeed, analysts estimated that the rumored deal would make Dr. Dre the first billionaire in the hip-hop music industry in terms of net worth, assuming that he held at least 15% ownership in the company prior to the deal. Dr. Dre was listed with a net worth of $550 million on Forbes' The World's Billionaires 2014 list. It was also estimated that the Carlyle Group would receive a profit of $1 billion from the sale of its minority stake in the company.

On May 28, 2014, Apple officially announced its intention to acquire Beats Electronics for $3 billion—with $400 million to be paid in Apple stock and the remainder in cash. Some reports suggested that the reduction in value may have been a result of lower-than-expected subscriber numbers for the Beats Music service. Iovine felt that Beats had always "belonged" with Apple, as the company modeled itself after Apple's "unmatched ability to marry culture and technology". In regard to the deal, Apple CEO Tim Cook stated that "Music is such an important part of all of our lives and holds a special place within our hearts at Apple. That's why we have kept investing in music and are bringing together these extraordinary teams so we can continue to create the most innovative music products and services in the world." Beyond stocking Beats products at its retail outlets, Apple did not provide any further indications over how Beats would be integrated into its product line at the time, and whether Beats Music, which competed with Apple's own iTunes Radio service, would continue to operate after the acquisition.

The acquisition closed on August 1, 2014. Dr. Dre and Iovine were hired as executive employees, and worked at Apple for years afterward.  To eliminate redundancy, Apple planned to lay off 200 workers from Beats' workforce of around 700. Beats Music was discontinued effective with the launch of Apple Music on June 30, 2015.

Bose lawsuit 
In July 2014, Bose Corporation sued Beats Electronics, alleging that its "Studio" line incorporated noise cancellation technology that infringed five patents held by the company. Bose has also sought an injunction which would ban the infringing products from being imported or sold in the United States. The lawsuit was settled out of court. Apple pulled all Bose products from its retail outlets, although it is unclear whether it was in response to the lawsuit, an ambush marketing conflict involving Beats and the NFL (which had recently named Bose as one of its official sponsors, and thus fined a player for displaying the Beats logo during an official activity), or as a result of Apple's acquisition of Beats. However, two months later, Bose products returned to the shelves of Apple Stores. The companies settled in October 2014: details were not disclosed.

Monster lawsuit 
In January 2015, Monster Inc. sued Beats for fraud, alleging that the company had used illicit tactics to force Monster out of the venture whilst retaining rights to the technologies and products that it had co-developed, and engaged in collusion to harm Monster's own audio products business. Monster argued that the acquisition of Beats by HTC and its founders' subsequent buyback was a "sham" to take control of Monster's stake in the company—which could have been valued at over $100 million in the Apple purchase, that the company had "concealed" the role of Monster and its CEO Noel Lee in the design and engineering of its products, and that "had the partnership expired on its own terms, there would have been no transfer of Monster's years of work [onto the company]". Monster also alleged that Beats had partaken in anti-competitive practices with retailers to force those offering Beats products to not offer Monster's competing products.

In June 2015, The Wall Street Journal reported that in retaliation for the lawsuit, Apple Inc. revoked Monster's membership in the MFi Program on May 5, 2015, meaning that Monster can no longer manufacture licensed accessories for iPhone, iPod and iPad products, and must cease the sale of existing licensed products that contain the certification or technology licensed through the program by September 2015.

The case was dismissed in August 2016, with a Supreme Court ruling that Beats "had the right to terminate the agreement as of January 7th, 2013 or when there was a transaction resulting in a change of control of Beats", and that Monster "did not obtain the right to approve the change of control. Nor did the agreement require that any change of control had to be objectively reasonable".

Products 

Beats' original product line were Beats by Dre headphones. In promotional materials, Dre outlined the line's advantages by alleging that listeners were not able to hear "all" of the music with most headphones, and that Beats would allow people to "hear what the artists hear, and listen to the music the way they should: the way I do". In comparison to most headphones, Beats products were characterized by an emphasis towards producing larger amounts of bass, and are particularly optimized towards hip-hop and pop music. In October 2012, Beats unveiled its first two self-developed products, the Beats Executive noise-cancelling headphones (to compete with similar offerings by Bose and Sennheiser) and the Beats Pill portable speaker. In October 2015, Beats launched a new collection of speakers including the upgraded Beats Pill+ Speaker.

Headphones

Beats Solo Pro 
The Beats Solo Pro is an on-the-ear style headphone. Along with the Powerbeats Pro true-wireless earphones, they are part of a new generation of Beats products made from the ground up with Apple. They are the first on-ear headphones made by Beats to feature active noise canceling. They were sold alongside the Solo 3 until November 1, 2021.

Beats Solo 3 Wireless 
This is an on-ear style headphone. It can last for 40 hours on a single charge or indefinitely when plugged in via the headphone jack.

Beats Studio 3 Wireless 
These are currently the high-end wireless headphones that Beats offers. They connect by Bluetooth and have 40 hours of battery life, with 22 hours of battery life with adaptive noise cancelling on. They feature Apple's W1 chip for quick connection to Apple devices running iOS 10, macOS Sierra, or watchOS 4 or later. They also feature pure adaptive noise cancelling technology, which uses microphones both inside and outside the ear cups to measure sound levels based on the environment. If there is any headgear or eyewear on the user's head, it calibrates the noise cancelling and volume level accordingly. The headphones come in a wide range of colors and editions, including black, blue and special collections such as the "NBA Collection".

Earbuds 
On September 7, 2016, Powerbeats³ were released. On February 10, 2017, BeatsX neckband-style headphones were released. Powerbeats Pro were released on May 10, 2019, in the United States and 2 weeks later for UK and Europe. The latest iteration of Powerbeats was released on March 18, 2020, sharing design concepts similar to that of the Powerbeats Pro from the year prior. On October 14, 2020, Beats Flex neckband-style headphones were released as the evolution of BeatsX. On June 14, 2021, Beats Studio Buds were released, and priced at US$149.99. On November 5, 2021, the Beats Fit Pro were released, featuring a novel "wingtip" earbud design to enhanced stability during fitness workouts.

Speakers 
In 2012, Beats introduced their first speaker product, the Pill.  In 2013, the Pill was replaced by the Pill 2 and a larger model, Pill XL, was introduced.  

The Pill XL was recalled and discontinued in mid-2015 due to battery safety concerns.  

The Pill 2 had a number of accessories available, including a bike mount and a speaker stand - the "Dude" - shaped like a small wide-mouthed person. 

The Pill 2 was replaced by the Pill+, which was introduced in late 2015 and was discontinued in early 2021.

Beats Audio 
The company has also licensed the Beats brand, under the name Beats Audio (stylized in lowercase as beats audio), and technology to other manufacturers. In 2009, HP began to offer personal computers equipped with Beats Audio systems, beginning with its HP Envy line. The system features a software equalizer with a preset that HP marketed as being optimized for higher quality sound output. Beats Electronics ceased its partnership with HP following its purchase by Apple Inc.; HP subsequently entered into a similar agreement with Bang & Olufsen.

Following its acquisition of a stake in the company, most new HTC smartphones began to be released with Beats Audio software, beginning with the HTC Sensation XE/XL with Beats Audio in September 2011. The software was to be included in most new HTC devices, such as the One series. The Sensation XE and Rezound were also bundled with Beats by Dre earbuds, but HTC abandoned the practice on future devices. An HTC product executive claimed that despite the prominence of the Beats brand, "an accessory like the headphone doesn't factor in when someone is buying a smartphone".

Car audio 
In 2011, Beats reached a deal with Chrysler LLC to feature Beats-branded audio systems in its vehicles. The first vehicle under the partnership was its 2012 Chrysler 300S luxury vehicle, which included a 10-speaker Beats by Dr. Dre sound system. Beats audio systems have also been available in models from Fiat Chrysler Automobiles' other brands, including Dodge, Chrysler, and Jeep.

Automobile brands that currently have Beats audio systems available in its vehicles are Fiat, Volkswagen, and SEAT.

Beats Music 

On July 2, 2012, Beats announced it had acquired the online music service MOG, in a purchase reported to have been between $10 million and $16 million. Beats stated that the acquisition was part of the company's goal to develop a "truly end-to-end music experience". The acquisition did not include the company's blog and advertising network, the MOG Music Network, which was sold in a separate transaction to the broadcasting company Townsquare Media in August 2012.

While MOG indicated that it would continue to operate independently with no immediate change in service, Beats subsequently announced a new subscription-based online music service, known as Beats Music, which launched in January 2014. In comparison to its competitors, such as Spotify and Google Play Music, the service emphasizes recommendations by music professionals alongside algorithmic recommendations. MOG was shut down on May 31, 2014, and existing users were directed to Beats Music. Beats Music was in turn replaced by Apple Music in June 2015; the service also incorporated a Beats-branded online radio station, called "Beats 1", but the name was later changed to "Apple Music 1".

Dolby Atmos Support 
In May 2021, Apple announced spatial audio with Dolby Atmos support. Apple Music will automatically play Dolby Atmos tracks on AirPods, AirPods Pro, AirPods Max, and all Beats headphones with an H1 or W1 chip.

Critical reception 
Some critics claim that Beats products emphasize appearance over quality and function, arguing that more durable and better-sounding products are available for the same price or lower. Tests done on an HTC smartphone with Beats Audio indicated that the audio technology is a combination of audio equalization that boosts the low (bass) and high ends of the audio range, audio compression, and audio amplification. In 2015, Beats president Luke Wood disagreed with accusations that Beats' products were "bass heavy", citing that their products were not for reference but rather for playback.

References

External links 
 

2006 establishments in California
2006 in technology
2010s fashion
American companies established in 2006
Apple Inc. acquisitions
Apple Inc. subsidiaries
Companies based in Culver City, California
Dr. Dre
Audio equipment manufacturers of the United States
Electronics companies established in 2006
Entertainment companies based in California
Headphones
Headphones manufacturers
Manufacturing companies based in Greater Los Angeles
Products introduced in 2008
Technology companies based in Greater Los Angeles
2010 mergers and acquisitions
2014 mergers and acquisitions